Epermenia falciformis, also known as the large lance-wing, is a moth of the family Epermeniidae found in Europe. It was first described by Adrian Hardy Haworth in 1828.

Description
The wingspan is 9–11 mm. Adults are on wing from June to July and again from August to September in two generations per year.

Ova are laid on angelica (Angelica sylvestris) and ground-elder (Aegopodium podagraria) in June and July, and in the Autumn. Larvae of the first generation feed in May and June in spun leaflets of their host plant, while larvae of the second generation mine a stem immediately below an umbel, causing it to droop and wither. When full grown, larvae leave via a small hole just before the junction above the main stem. Pupation takes place in an open network cocoon amongst detritus on the ground.

Distribution
It is found in Austria, Belgium, the Czech Republic, Denmark, France, Fennoscandia, Germany, Great Britain and Ireland, Latvia, the Netherlands and Slovakia.

References

Epermeniidae
Leaf miners
Moths described in 1828
Moths of Europe
Taxa named by Adrian Hardy Haworth